The Atomic Monsieur Placido (French: L'atomique Monsieur Placido) is a 1950 French comedy crime film directed by Robert Hennion and starring Rellys, Liliane Bert and René Génin.

Cast
 Rellys as Toni / Placido
 Liliane Bert as Zaza
 René Génin as Le violoniste
 Jean Témerson as Un maître d'hôtel
 Michel Ardan as Jim
 René Alié as Un gangster
 Arsenio Freignac as Sainclair
 Georges Bever as Un maître d'hôtel
 Henri Chauve 
 Pierre Destailles as Le gérant de l'hôtel
 Jean Dunot as Le policier
 Gayot 
 Philippe Janvier as L'impresario
 Rudy Lenoir 
 Julien Maffre as Le directeur 
 Jacques Provins as L'Égyptien
 Marcel Rouzé 
 Zoïga 
 Nina Myral as La vieille dame 
 Madeleine Suffel as Une comédienne
 Blanche Ariel 
 Christiane Barry as Une comédienne
 Jacqueline Lerinat 
 Lisette Lebon 
 Robert Arnoux as Joe 
 Nicolas Amato as Le régisseur
 Jacques Beauvais as Un maître d'hôtel

References

Bibliography 
 Maurice Bessy, Raymond Chirat & André Bernard. Histoire du cinéma français: 1940-1950. Pygmalion, 1986.

External links 
 

1950s crime comedy films
French crime comedy films
1950 films
1950s French-language films
1950 comedy films
French black-and-white films
1950s French films